Dharmesvara Temple  located in Kondrahalli, Bangalore Rural,  Hoskote Taluk in Bangalore, Karnataka, India  is  dedicated to the deity
Dharmesvara (the Hindu god Shiva). It dates back to the Chola period 1065 AD. The temple also has 5000 years history and as informed by the temple in charge Mr. Manjunath.

Yaksha kandam of Mahabharata is believed to have taken place in this site. The temple has a pond wherein, as per the Mahabharata epic, the four Pandava princes die while fetching water. As per legend, Dharmaraja challenges the Yaksha and answers the 248 questions and gets the boon from lord Yama in return, to bring back to life his four brothers.

Reference List 

Chola architecture
Hindu temples in Bangalore Rural district